"You Know I'm No Good" is a song written and performed by English singer Amy Winehouse from her second and final studio album, Back to Black (2006). "You Know I'm No Good" was released as the second single from Back to Black on 5 January 2007. Originally recorded as a solo track, it was remixed with guest vocals from the Wu-Tang Clan member Ghostface Killah. The original appeared on Winehouse's album, while the version with Ghostface Killah appears on his album More Fish.

Arctic Monkeys performed this song on Jo Whiley's Live Lounge on BBC Radio 1 in their second appearance there, along with their single at the time, "Brianstorm". In summer 2007, "You Know I'm No Good" was used in advertisements and in the first season opening for AMC's TV drama Mad Men, although it was replaced with the current theme song for DVD release. It was also used for the opening to ITV's Secret Diary of a Call Girl. On the recap of The Best Songs of 2007 by Entertainment Weekly magazine, this song ranked at number two.

Music video
The music video, directed by Phil Griffin (who also directed the video for her previous hit "Rehab"), was released to music channels in late November 2006. The video features Winehouse in numerous settings including a bar, a bedroom, and a bathtub. The plot is based around Winehouse's fictional character's relationship with the male character in the video. Video was shot by director of photography Adam Frisch and the sets were built at 3 Mills Studios in East London.

The video premiered on VH1 during the weekend of 3 March 2007. Following its VH1 premiere, it was placed on MTV's Big 10 rotation as of 5 March 2007 and was premiered on TRL the same day. The song was heard on a sneak preview of AMC's original series Mad Men.

Release
The single was released in the UK on 8 January 2007. The track made it onto BBC Radio 1's A-list playlist. A UK edit of the remix featuring Ghostface Killah was also sent to radio, and to download services, and the original full-length US version, featuring Ghostface Killah name-checking Kelly Clarkson amongst others, also received airplay in the United States, where it was added to numerous Rhythmic radio stations.

Following Winehouse's success at the 50th Grammy Awards, the song was re-released in the US in mid-February 2008.

A documentary film based on the life and death of Winehouse was released, Amy (2015) and a performance of Winehouse performing You Know I'm No Good at 45th at Night, in 2007 was featured.

Reception
Critical response to the single was positive. For the week of 16 January 2007, the track was chosen as the Single of the Week on the US iTunes Store as a free download. Newsweek also chose the song as its Pick of the Week for 15 January of the same year. Billboard found that the track—"in original form—could be no better"; however, it acknowledged that the Ghostface Killah remix added a "ferocious discordant sputter at the midsection."  People magazine called the track "instantly memorable." 
Prior to this, Winehouse had not seen any success in the US, as her debut album Frank was not released there until November 2007. On the Billboard Hot 100, "You Know I'm No Good" debuted at number 91 spot ahead of "Rehab", which also debuted on the chart the same week. The single peaked on the UK Singles Chart at number 18 for the week ending 14 January 2007, in an excellent week for Winehouse that saw Back to Black achieve a new UK peak of number one, previous single "Rehab" return to the UK top 20, and Frank re-enter the UK chart at number 62 more than three years after its first release. To date, the single, which spent a total of 11 consecutive weeks on the UK Singles Chart, has sold 53,272 copies in the UK.

Winehouse performed the song at the 50th Annual Grammy Awards ceremony while in London, along with her hit single "Rehab". The performance was broadcast internationally via satellite. The song's performance on the awards ceremony subsequently led to an increase in digital downloads, notably on iTunes, where the song re-entered the Top Songs chart at number 55 in the United States. This resulted in a new peak for the song on the Billboard Hot 100, of number 77, one spot ahead of its previous peak.
Arctic Monkeys performed a cover of the song on their 2007 tour.

A remix by Ghostface Killah appears on the reissue of Back to Black, featuring one verse by Ghostface, and a second remix, featuring more Ghostface verses, appears on his album More Fish.

English actor Roger Moore jokingly said he had no idea why Winehouse chose to include him in the lyrics, unless she wanted a word that rhymed with "door", or could not find a word that rhymed with "Connery".

Following her death, the song re-entered the UK Singles Chart at number 37.

Track listings
UK CD 1
"You Know I'm No Good" (radio edit) – 3:36
"To Know Him Is to Love Him" (NapsterLive Session)

UK CD 2
"You Know I'm No Good" – 4:16
"Monkey Man"
"You Know I'm No Good" (Skeewiff Mix)

European CD single
"You Know I'm No Good" – 4:16
"You Know I'm No Good" (radio edit) – 3:36
"You Know I'm No Good" (featuring Ghostface Killah)
"You Know I'm No Good" (Skeewiff Mix)

German 12-inch promotional single
A1. "You Know I'm No Good" (Skeewiff Mix)
A2. "You Know I'm No Good" – 4:16
A3. "You Know I'm No Good" (Instrumental) – 4:16
B1. "You Know I'm No Good" (Ghostface Killah Version)
B2. "You Know I'm No Good" (Fettes Brot Remix)
B3. "You Know I'm No Good" (A Cappella)

US 12-inch single (Universal Republic B0008491-11)
A1. "You Know I'm No Good" – (radio edit) – 3:36
A2. "You Know I'm No Good" (featuring Ghostface Killah) – 3:22
B1. "Rehab" – 3:32
B2. "Rehab" (Hot Chip Remix) – 6:58

Digital download – Remixes & B-Sides EP (2015)
"You Know I'm No Good" (featuring Ghostface Killah) (Ghostface UK Version) – 3:23
"You Know I'm No Good" (Skeewiff Mix) – 5:45
"You Know I'm No Good" – 4:16
"You Know I'm No Good" (Vodafone Live at TBA) – 4:21
"You Know I'm No Good" (Fettes Brot Remix) – 3:52

Charts

Weekly charts

Year-end charts

Certifications and sales

References

2006 songs
2007 singles
Amy Winehouse songs
British hip hop songs
Island Records singles
Song recordings produced by Mark Ronson
Songs about infidelity
Songs written by Amy Winehouse
Wanda Jackson songs
Television drama theme songs